Nonoxynol-9, sometimes abbreviated as N-9, is an organic compound that is used as a surfactant.  It is a member of the  nonoxynol family of nonionic surfactants.  N-9 and related compounds are ingredients in various cleaning and cosmetic products.  It is widely used in contraceptives for its spermicidal properties.

Uses

Spermicide
As a spermicide, it attacks the acrosomal membranes of the sperm, causing the sperm to be immobilized.
Nonoxynol-9 is the active ingredient in most spermicidal creams, jellies, foams, gel, film, and suppositories.

Lubricant
Nonoxynol-9 is a common ingredient of most vaginal and anal lubricants due to its spermicidal properties.

A 2004 study found that over a six-month period, the typical-use failure rates for five nonoxynol-9 vaginal contraceptives (film, suppository, and gels at three different concentrations) ranged from 10% to 20%.

Condoms
Many models of condoms are lubricated with solutions containing nonoxynol-9. In this role, it has been promoted as a backup method for avoiding pregnancy and a microbicide for sexually transmitted diseases in the event of condom failure. However, the 2001 WHO / CONRAD Technical Consultation on Nonoxynol-9 concluded that: There is no published scientific evidence that N-9-lubricated condoms provide any additional protection against pregnancy or STDs compared with condoms lubricated with other products.  Since adverse effects due to the addition of N-9 to condoms cannot be excluded, such condoms should no longer be promoted.  However, it is better to use N-9-lubricated condoms than no condoms.

Compared to regular lubricated condoms, condoms containing nonoxynol-9 present another disadvantage — they are limited by the shelf-life of the
spermicide.

Cervical barriers
Almost all brands of diaphragm jelly contain nonoxynol-9 as the active ingredient.  This jelly may also be used for a cervical cap. Most contraceptive sponges contain nonoxynol-9 as an active ingredient.

Shaving cream
Nonoxynol-9 is sometimes included in shaving creams for its properties as a nonionic surfactant; it helps break down skin oils that normally protect hair from moisture, so that they become wet and, hence, softer and easier to shave. Gillette formerly used nonoxynol-9 for this purpose in its Foamy products, but has discontinued the practice.

Sports cream
Nonoxynol-9 is also found in Bengay Vanishing Scent as an inactive ingredient.

Poison ivy creams
Nonoxynol-9 is also found in Zanfel poison ivy cream.  It effectively helps to break up the oil urushiol that causes the rash.

Side effects
From 1996 to 2000, a UN-sponsored study conducted in several locations in Africa followed nearly 1,000 sex workers who used nonoxynol-9 gels or a placebo. The HIV infection rate among those using nonoxynol-9 was about 50% higher than those who used the placebo; those using nonoxynol-9 also had a higher incidence of vaginal lesions, which may have contributed to this increased risk. Whereas these results may not be directly applicable to lower-frequency use, these findings combined with lack of any demonstrated HIV-prevention benefit from nonoxynol-9 use led the World Health Organization to recommend that it no longer be used by those at high risk of HIV infection. The WHO further notes that "Nonoxynol-9 offers no protection against sexually transmitted infections such as gonorrhoea, chlamydia." A 2006 study of a nonoxynol-9 vaginal gel in female sex workers in Africa concluded that it did not prevent genital human papillomavirus (HPV) infection and could increase the virus's ability to infect or persist.

References

External links
 Safety of Nonoxynol-9 when used for contraception World Health Organization (October 2001)
 Vaginal Spermicide: Nonoxynol Family Practice Notebook.com
 Docs: 'Nonoxynol-9 Doesn't Work' Wired News: Lite, Jordan (May 13, 2002)
 Info on microbicides
 ChemSub Online: Nonoxynol-9
 

Phenol ethers
Glycol ethers
Primary alcohols
Spermicide
Non-ionic surfactants
Drugs acting on the genito-urinary system
Microbicides